Rebecca Clarke or Rebecca Clark may refer to:

Rebecca Clarke (composer) (1886–1979), English classical composer and violist
Rebecca Sophia Clarke (1833–1906), American author of children's fiction
Rebecca Clarke, an actress in Pompeii: The Last Day
Rebecca Clarke, Australian playwright and performer of one-woman play Unspoken
Rebecca Faye Clark (known as Rebecca Pow, born 1960), British member of Parliament